The MIAA Division 1A Boy's Ice Hockey Tournament, commonly referred to as the Super Eight, is an annual boy's high school ice hockey tournament held by the Massachusetts Interscholastic Athletic Association (MIAA) to determine the top boys' team in the state.

The tournament's future is in jeopardy. The Tournament Management Committee voted to not accept any Division 1A tournament proposals until at least the 2025–26 academic year. If the MIAA Board of Directors votes to side with the TMC, then no Division 1A boy's ice hockey tournament would be held until 2026 at the earliest. The Ice Hockey Committee will appeal the decision.

History 
The Super Eight is a double-elimination tournament that has determined the high school state champion since the inaugural 1991 tournament. The tournament features 10 teams. The selection committee seeds the teams 1 to 10. The tournament begins with two play-in games culminating with the finals played at TD Garden. The games leading up to the finals have been scheduled at neutral sites, including Tsongas Center, Chelmsford Forum, and other rinks in the state. The tournament is the basis for the creation of the Division 1A baseball tournament, which was established in 2014, to crown a state champion.

On March 12, 2020, the MIAA announced that the state finals games across all divisions scheduled for that weekend would be canceled due to the COVID-19 pandemic. Thus, Arlington and Pope Francis were both declared co-champions for the first time in the Super Eight tournament. The MIAA did not sponsor winter tournaments in 2021, thus no Super Eight was held.

On April 16, 2021, the MIAA Tournament Management Committee voted to accept the Blue Ribbon Committee's proposal that they will “not consider any applications for a 1A Tournament until July 1, 2025, to ensure MIAA sport committees can support their applications with four years of data under the new statewide tournament structure starting in the fall 2021 season.” The Blue Ribbon Committee cited "consistency, equity, and Title IX compliance across all sports" as the reasoning. The MIAA Division 1A Boy's Ice Hockey Tournament along with the Division 1A baseball tournament cannot return until the 2025–26 academic year if the committee votes to approve. The TMC believes that the 4-year gap will allow sports committees to gather substantial data with the new statewide tournament to better support their future proposals for a Division 1A tournament. However, the Board of Directors must approve the TMC vote before it becomes official.

On April 29, the MIAA Ice Hockey Committee announced that they will appeal the decision made by the TMC.

Tournament format history 
1991–2000
 8 teams (double-elimination)

2000–2003
 10 teams (4-team single-game play-in; double-elimination)

2004–2012
 10 teams (4-team single-game play-in; round-robin; single-game semifinal and final)

2013–2017
 10 teams (4-team single-game play-in; best-of-three quarterfinals; single-game semifinal and final)

2018–present
 10 teams (4-team single-game play-in; double-elimination with a single-game championship)

Results

Team titles

Tournaments

1991
 Catholic Memorial School ^
 St. John's Preparatory School
 Boston College High School
 Matignon High School
 Medford High School
 Reading Memorial High School
 Arlington High School
 Billerica Memorial High School
^ Tournament Champion

1992
 Catholic Memorial School ^
 Matignon High School
 Woburn Memorial High School
 St. John's Preparatory School
 Don Bosco Technical High School
 Newton North High School
 Reading Memorial High School
 Arlington High School
^ Tournament Champion

1993
 Catholic Memorial School ^
 Medford High School
 Archbishop Williams High School
 Billerica Memorial High School
 Arlington High School
 St. John's High School
 Burlington High School
 Weymouth High School
^ Tournament Champion

1994
 Catholic Memorial School ^
 St. John's Preparatory School
 Arlington High School
 Arlington Catholic High School
 Wakefield Memorial High School
 Framingham High School
 Matignon High School
 Falmouth High School
^ Tournament Champion

1995
 Catholic Memorial School ^
 Boston College High School
 Arlington Catholic High School
 Arlington High School
 Newton North High School
 Reading Memorial High School
 Matignon High School
 Acton-Boxborough Regional High School
^ Tournament Champion

1996
 Boston College High School ^
 Catholic Memorial School
 Matignon High School
 Reading Memorial High School
 Arlington Catholic High School
 Arlington High School
 Acton-Boxborough Regional High School
 Tewksbury Memorial High School
^ Tournament Champion

1997
 Catholic Memorial School
 Matignon High School
 Arlington Catholic High School ^
 St. John's High School
 Boston College High School
 Reading Memorial High School
 Billerica Memorial High School
 Chelmsford High School
^ Tournament Champion

1998
 Catholic Memorial School ^*
 Archbishop Williams High School
 Arlington High School
 Boston College High School
 Billerica Memorial High School
 Reading Memorial High School
 Arlington Catholic High School
 St. John's Preparatory School
^ Tournament Champion

Catholic Memorial School won the Super Eight tournament with a perfect 24-0-0 season record.

1999
 Boston College High School
 Reading Memorial High School
 Archbishop Williams High School
 Arlington High School
 St. John's Preparatory School
 Catholic Memorial School^
 Matignon High School
 Waltham High School
^ Tournament Champion

2000
 Catholic Memorial School ^
 Boston College High School
 Arlington High School
 Austin Preparatory School
 Arlington Catholic High School
 Reading Memorial High School
 Needham High School
 St. John's High School
^ Tournament Champion

2001
 Winchester High School
 Arlington High School
 Catholic Memorial School^
 Austin Preparatory School
 Boston College High School
 Reading Memorial High School
 Springfield Cathedral High School
 St. John's High School
 Archbishop Williams High School
 Matignon High School
^ Tournament Champion

2002
 St. John's High School
 Boston College High School^
 Austin Preparatory School
 Hingham High School
 Catholic Memorial School
 Billerica Memorial High School
 Chelmsford High School
 Reading Memorial High School
 Arlington Catholic High School
 Arlington High School
^ Tournament Champion

2003
 Boston College High School
 Catholic Memorial School^
 Arlington High School
 Hingham High School
 Austin Preparatory School
 Arlington Catholic High School
 Belmont High School
 Chelmsford High School
 St. John's High School
 St. John's Preparatory School
^ Tournament Champion

2004
 Catholic Memorial School^
 Boston College High School
 Arlington Catholic High School
 Hingham High School
 Waltham High School
 St. John's Preparatory School
 Belmont High School
 Duxbury High School
 Billerica Memorial High School
 Framingham High School
^ Tournament Champion

2005
 Catholic Memorial School^
 Boston College High School
 Hingham High School
 Waltham High School
 Arlington Catholic High School
 Reading Memorial High School
 Duxbury High School
 Medford High School
 Austin Preparatory School
 St. John's Preparatory School
^ Tournament Champion

2006
 Catholic Memorial School
 Boston College High School^
 Arlington Catholic High School
 Medford High School
 Hingham High School
 Duxbury High School
 Winchester High School
 Acton-Boxborough Regional High School
 Austin Preparatory School
 St. John's Preparatory School
^ Tournament Champion

2007
The ten teams to qualify for the 2007 Super Eight tournament are listed below.

 Catholic Memorial School (14-1-2)
 St. John's Preparatory School (11-3-6)
 Boston College High School (14-4-2)
 Malden Catholic High School (13-4-2)
 Weymouth High School (19-1-0)
 Reading Memorial High School (19-3-0)
 Woburn Memorial High School (16-2-2)
 Central Catholic High School (16-2-2)
 Waltham High School (18-3-1)
 Austin Preparatory School (13-5-2)

Bracket

Bracket A

Bracket B

Semifinals and Finals

2008
The ten teams to qualify for the 2008 Super Eight tournament are listed below.

 Catholic Memorial School (14-1-3)
 Hingham High School (17-3-2)
 St. John's Preparatory School (12-5-3)
 Boston College High School (11-4-5)
 Reading Memorial High School (20-1-0)
 Malden Catholic High School (11-5-4)
 Needham High School (16-3-2)
 Waltham High School (15-3-4)
 Westford Academy (15-5-1)
 Xaverian Brothers High School (10-6-3)

2009

The ten teams to qualify for the 2009 Super Eight tournament are listed below.

 Catholic Memorial School (10-4-4)
 Needham High School (18-3-1)
 Malden Catholic High School (15-3-2)
 Hingham High School (15-2-5)
 Central Catholic High School (15-0-7)
 Xaverian Brothers High School (14-4-2)
 Burlington High School (17-2-1)
 Winchester High School (16-3-1)
 Springfield Cathedral High School (13-4-2)
 Arlington Catholic High School (12-4-4)

2010

The ten teams to qualify for the 2010 Super Eight tournament are listed below.

 Catholic Memorial School (14-3-1)
 Austin Preparatory School (16-1-3)
 Hingham High School (17-2-3)
 Malden Catholic High School (13-3-4)
 Needham High School (17-1-3)
 Springfield Cathedral High School (15-2-5)
 Xaverian Brothers High School (12-5-3)
 Winchester High School (13-4-2)
 Burlington High School (14-4-2)
 Central Catholic High School (13-4-3)

2011

The ten teams to qualify for the 2011 Super Eight tournament are listed below.

 Malden Catholic High School (16-2-2)
 St. John's Preparatory School (14-5-1)
 Boston College High School (13-4-3)
 Weymouth High School (17-3-2)
 Hingham High School (13-5-4)
 Needham High School (12-6-4)
 Woburn Memorial High School (17-3-1)
 Central Catholic High School (16-5-1)
 St. Mary's High School (13-4-3)
 Springfield Cathedral High School (12-9-1)

2012
The ten teams to qualify for the 2012 Super Eight tournament are listed below.

 Malden Catholic High School (15-1-4)
 St. Mary's High School (18-0-3)
 St. John's Preparatory School (13-5-2)
 Hingham High School (16-4-2)
 Boston College High School (10-5-5)
 Springfield Cathedral High School (10-6-6)
 Burlington High School (14-1-6)
 Needham High School (16-4-1)
 St. John's High School (15-4-3)
 Central Catholic High School (12-3-5)

Bracket

Bracket A

Bracket B

Semifinals and finals

* indicates one overtime period
** indicates shootout

2013

The ten teams to qualify for the 2013 Super Eight tournament are listed below.

 St. John's Preparatory School (17-2-1)
 Springfield Cathedral High School (16-1-4)
 Boston College High School (14-3-3)
 Austin Preparatory School (13-1-6)
 Reading Memorial High School (16-1-5)
 Catholic Memorial School (12-6-2)
 Archbishop Williams High School (12-4-4)
 Central Catholic High School (13-5-3)
 Hingham High School (13-7-2)
 Malden Catholic High School (11-6-3)

Bracket

2014

The ten teams to qualify for the 2014 Super Eight tournament are listed below.

 Boston College High School (14-2-4)
 Malden Catholic High School (16-4-0)
 Springfield Cathedral High School (15-2-5)
 Austin Preparatory School (13-4-4)
 Central Catholic High School (16-3-3)
 Duxbury High School (16-2-3)
 Braintree High School (13-4-3)
 Xaverian Brothers High School (11-3-6)
 Archbishop Williams High School (12-5-3)
 Catholic Memorial School (9-7-4)

Bracket

2015
The ten teams to qualify for the 2015 Super Eight tournament are listed below.

 Springfield Cathedral High School (20-0-2)
 Malden Catholic High School (16-1-2)
 Austin Preparatory School (19-1-1)
 Boston College High School (13-5-2)
 St. John's Preparatory School (14-5-1)
 Central Catholic High School (15-5-2)
 Franklin High School (Massachusetts) (16-1-3)
 Woburn Memorial High School (15-1-4)
 Burlington High School (16-1-4)
 Xaverian Brothers High School (11-3-6)

Bracket

2016
The ten teams to qualify for the 2016 Super Eight tournament are listed below.

 Boston College High School (17-0-3)
 Pope Francis High School (15-3-2)
 Malden Catholic High School (14-3-3)
 St. John's Preparatory School (14-2-4)
 Burlington High School (17-1-3)
 Austin Preparatory School (13-4-3)
 Arlington High School (15-3-3)
 Reading Memorial High School (12-2-6
 Central Catholic High School (14-7-1)
 Hingham High School (11-8-3)

Bracket

See also 
 MIAA Division IA Baseball Championship

References

External links
 Boston Globe coverage of tournament
 MIAA Mens State Champions 1943 Present

1991 establishments in Massachusetts
High school ice hockey in the United States
Massachusetts Interscholastic Athletic Association
Recurring sporting events established in 1991